Borynia refers to:

 Borynia, Turka Raion, town in Ukraine
 Borynia, Jastrzębie-Zdrój, village in Poland